Martha Mitchell is an American television director.

She has directed for a number of notable television series. Prior to directing, Mitchell worked as a script supervisor on numerous films, the pilot episode of New York Undercover and episodes of Law & Order from 1990 to 1996.

She is a graduate of Barnard College.

Selected filmography 
NCIS
House, M.D.
Without a Trace
New York Undercover
Prey
Strange Luck
Malibu Shores
Close to Home
Numb3rs
Spy Game
Judging Amy
Law & Order
Charmed
Jericho
Joan of Arcadia
The Guardian
Family Law
Veronica Mars
Timecop
Promised Land
The Division
The Education of Max Bickford
Haunted
Now and Again
The Practice
Chicago Hope
The Mentalist
Mercy
The Protector
NYC 22
Raising the Bar
Unforgettable
Blue Bloods
The Fosters
You
The Enemy Within
Blindspot

References

External links
 
 

American television directors
Barnard College alumni
American women television directors
Living people
Place of birth missing (living people)
Year of birth missing (living people)